Branch (earlier Branch Metrics) is a mobile software company focused on mobile deep linking and attribution. The headquarters of the Branch is located in Palo Alto, California.

History 
Branch Metrics was founded on April 15, 2014 by Alex Austin, Mike Molinet, Mada Seghete, and Dmitri Gaskin. In the summer of 2014, the company completed the StartX Accelerator program at Stanford University.

In September 2014, Branch announced the completion of a $3 million venture funding round led by New Enterprise Associates. In 2015 Branch won a startup competition at Mobile World Congress. 

In February 2015, the company completed a $15 million Series A funding followed by additional $35 million funding in January 2016. 

In April 2017, the company raised $60 million in Series C funding from Andy Rubin’s Playground Ventures.

In September 2018, the company authorized the sale of $129 million in Series D shares, and acquired the attribution analytics platform TUNE.

In February 2022, Branch raised $300M in Series F funding at a $4B valuation, led by New Enterprise Associates.  

In 2022, the company acquired two applications of Android customization — Nova Launcher and Sesame Search, and a data platform — AdLibertas.

Technology 
Branch has developed improved deep linking technology that directs users to a specific place within the app the first time a link is clicked, even if the app has not been installed. To do this, Branch Metrics is combining deep linking technology with matching technology.

Branch also uses tools for cohort analysis and touchpoint tracking.

References 
Companies based in Palo Alto, California
Internet technology companies